The High Sheriff of Kerry was the British Crown's judicial representative in County Kerry, Ireland from the 16th century until 1922, when the office was abolished in the new Free State and replaced by the office of Kerry County Sheriff. The sheriff had judicial, electoral, ceremonial and administrative functions and executed High Court Writs. In 1908, an Order in Council made the Lord-Lieutenant the Sovereign's prime representative in a county and reduced the High Sheriff's precedence. However, the sheriff retained his responsibilities for the preservation of law and order in the county. The usual procedure for appointing the sheriff from 1660 onwards was that three persons were nominated at the beginning of each year from the county and the Lord Lieutenant then appointed his choice as High Sheriff for the remainder of the year. Often the other nominees were appointed as under-sheriffs. Sometimes a sheriff did not fulfil his entire term through death or other event and another sheriff was then appointed for the remainder of the year. The dates given hereunder are the dates of appointment. All addresses are in County Kerry unless stated otherwise.

High Sheriffs of County Kerry
1311: Richard Brun
1565: Fyneen mac Teige-Mer-Gagh O'Mahony, seneschal of Desmond, became high sheriff when Donald Mc Carthy Mor lost his title of king of Desmond for the one of earl of Clancare
1585: Ralph Lane
1585: Maurice O'Connell
1588: Edward Denny of Tralee Castle
1592: Thomas Spring of Castlemaine
1602: Walter Hussey of Moyle and Dingle
1609: Walter Spring of Castlemaine and Killagha Abbey
1614: Geoffrey O'Connell
1622: Robert Blennerhassett of Tralee
1623: Sir Valentine Browne, 1st Baronet
1634: Sir Edward Denny, Kt of Tralee Castle
1638: Turlogh Mac Mahon
1639: Daniel Mac Dermot O'Mahony
1641: Sir Thomas Harris
1641: John Blennerhassett of Ballyseedy, Tralee
1642: Edward Blennerhassett of Ballycarty Castle
1650: Son of Lord Roche (shot at Macroom Castle)
1654: Sir Thomas Southwell, 1st Baronet (also Sheriff of Clare and Limerick)
1656: Arthur Denny of Tralee Castle
1658: John Blennerhassett of Ballyseedy, Tralee
1659: Thomas Herbert
1660: Rowland Bateman
1660: Patrick Crosbie of Tubrid
1661: Thomas Crosbie of Ardfert
1663: John Blennerhassett of Tralee
1668: Sir Thomas Crosbie of Ardfert
1669: Rowland Bateman of Killeen
1671: William Naper
1679: Thomas Blennerhassett of Letter
1682: Robert Blennerhassett of Killorglin
1683: Captain William Reeves
1683: David Crosbie
1685: Henry Stoughton
1686: Donogh Mac Gillicuddy
1688: John Browne
1693: Edward Herbert
1695: Barry Denny
1699: William Crosbie

18th century

19th century

20th century

References

 
Kerry
History of County Kerry